Heartbreaker is the sixth and final studio album by the English rock band Free, that provided them with one of their most successful singles, "Wishing Well". It was recorded in late 1972 after bassist Andy Fraser had left the band and while guitarist Paul Kossoff was ailing from an addiction to Mandrax (Quaalude) and features a different line up from previous albums. Tetsu Yamauchi was brought in to replace Fraser, while John "Rabbit" Bundrick became the band's keyboard player to compensate for the increasingly unreliable Kossoff (singer Paul Rodgers played keyboards on the previous album 1972 Free at Last). Both Yamauchi and Bundrick had played with Kossoff and drummer Simon Kirke on the album Kossoff, Kirke, Tetsu & Rabbit during that period in late 1971 when Free had broken up for the first time. Also, several other musicians were used on the album. The album was co-produced by Andy Johns as well as Free themselves.

Recording
One immediate effect of Fraser's departure was the loss of the Fraser/Rodgers songwriting partnership that had hitherto provided the bulk of the band's catalogue. Hence many of the songs were written solely by Rodgers, although some are credited to the entire band as a symbolic gesture, including the single "Wishing Well". Bundrick wrote two of the album's eight tracks.

Meanwhile, Kossoff was extremely resentful of "Snuffy" Walden being brought in as a session musician to provide guitar tracks when the other band members' patience began to break. This exacerbated his problems even further, but on those occasions where recording went well he produced some notable work; he is in fact far more prominent on this album than on the previous one. He is uncredited on the hit single "Wishing Well", however, the lead guitar on the track is unmistakably Kossoff's, and Kirke has confirmed this.

The credits on the album sleeve are inaccurate; Kossoff plays on the whole of side 1 and the final track on side 2, "Seven Angels". Walden's guitar appears on tracks 2, 3, and 4 of side 2, so "Seven Angels" features both him and Kossoff. Walden also appears on some alternate mixes of "Wishing Well", but not on the version released for the UK single and album. The Free box set Songs of Yesterday (
2000) features an alternate mix of "Muddy Water" with guitar by Walden, and an alternate mix of "Common Mortal Man" with guitar by both Walden and Kossoff.

Island Records boss Chris Blackwell disliked the band's initial mix of the album and drafted regular engineer Andy Johns to solve the problem; in January 1973 the album was ready for release.

Reception

The album was, by Free's standards, a huge success. It became their third top-ten album in the UK (reaching #9), and reached No. 47 in America, which was also a considerable success for the band. Also, the single release "Wishing Well" became their third-most successful single, reaching No. 7. It is widely regarded as one of their definitive songs.

Despite the success of the album and impending tour of America, it finally became apparent that the band had passed the point of no return. Kossoff being credited as an additional musician came as a shock to the entire band. Kossoff spiralled to his lowest ebb and was unable to go to America; he was replaced, for the tour, by Wendell Richardson from Osibisa, against Rodgers' instincts. Richardson proved (through no fault of his own) to be the wrong choice, and once the tour ended the band finally gave up. Rodgers and Kirke formed Bad Company with Mick Ralphs (formerly of Mott the Hoople) and Boz Burrell (formerly of King Crimson); Yamauchi joined Faces; Bundrick became a session musician and eventually became a regular keyboard player with the Who; Kossoff formed his own band Back Street Crawler, which Bundrick joined in the later stages of. After one solo album by Kossoff "Backstreet Crawler" was well received, and one Backstreet Crawler Band release " The Band Plays On" and live dates in the UK in 1975, and USA in 1976, Kossoff regained his playing form. The guitarist sadly died of a Pulmonary Embolism on board a plane bound for New York on 19 March 1976, at the age of 25. A further Backstreet Crawler album called " 2nd Street" was released posthumously which is also well regarded.

Track listing
Side one
"Wishing Well" (Rodgers, Kirke, Yamauchi, Kossoff, Bundrick) – 3:43
"Come Together in the Morning" (Rodgers) – 4:38
"Travellin' in Style" (Rodgers, Kirke, Yamauchi, Kossoff, Bundrick) – 4:01
"Heartbreaker" (Rodgers) – 6:12
Side two
"Muddy Water" (Bundrick) – 4:15
"Common Mortal Man" (Bundrick) – 4:06
"Easy on My Soul" (Rodgers) – 3:44
"Seven Angels" (Rodgers) – 5:03

Extra tracks
"Wishing Well" (US mix) – 3:39 (includes additional guitar overdubs by Walden)
"Let Me Show You" (Single 'B' side) (Rodgers, Kirke, Yamauchi, Bundrick) – 3:01
"Muddy Water" (Alternative vocals) – 4:15
"Hand Me Down/Turn Me Round" (Prospective album track) (Bundrick) – 3:19
"Heartbreaker" (Rehearsal version) – 5:40
"Easy on My Soul" (Rehearsal version) – 8:42

Covers

 Kiki Dee has covered "Travellin' in Style" on her third solo album Loving & Free (1973).
 Having performed "Wishing Well" live since the release of Free's 1973 Heartbreaker, Australian band Sherbet included a cover of the song on their 1975 live album In Concert.
 Maggie Bell covered "Wishing Well" on her second solo album Suicide Sal (1975).
 Southern rock band Blackfoot covered "Wishing Well" on their album Strikes (1979).
 Cherie & Marie Currie covered "Wishing Well" on their 1980 album Messin' with the Boys; their cover also appeared on their compilation Young and Wild (1998).
 Gary Moore covered "Wishing Well" on Corridors of Power (1982).
 Savatage covered "Wishing Well" on their 1986 album Fight for the Rock.
 Styx covered "Wishing Well" on Big Bang Theory (2005).
 Melodic heavy metal German guitarist Axel Rudi Pell covered "Wishing Well" on Between the Walls (1994), and "Heartbreaker" on Diamonds Unlocked (2007).
 "Heartbreaker" has also been covered by Joe Bonamassa (with Glenn Hughes) on his 2011 release Dust Bowl, as well as by doom metal band Goatsnake on their 2000 EP Dog Days.
 New England acoustic folk music group FolksTogether covered "Wishing Well" on their 2005 album "Pilgrims" (FolkSounds, Ltd. FSL-2003-2).

Personnel
 Paul Rodgers – lead vocals (all tracks); lead guitar (5 & 7); rhythm guitar (1-4); piano (7)
 Paul Kossoff – lead guitar (1-4, 6, 8)
 Simon Kirke – drums (all tracks); percussion (2-4, 6-8); rhythm guitar (5)
 John "Rabbit" Bundrick – organ (all tracks), piano (1-6, 8), backing vocals (all tracks)
 Tetsu Yamauchi – bass (all tracks); percussion (5)
 W.G. "Snuffy" Walden – rhythm guitar (6-8)
 Rebop Kwaku Baah – percussion (1)

NOTE: The album lists Kossoff as an additional musician.

References

 Strong, Martin C. The Great Rock Discography, 6th edition. Edinburgh: Canongate Books 1994, 2002. pp. 392–3.
 Sutcliffe, Phil. Notes to Heartbreaker by Free. Universal Island Records Ltd. 1973, 2002.

External links
 
 Lyrics of cover of "Wishing Well" by Queen + Paul Rodgers at Queen official website (from Return of the Champions)
 Free - Heartbreaker (1973) album review by Matthew Greenwald, credits & releases at AllMusic
 Free - Heartbreaker (1973) album releases & credits at Discogs
 Free - Heartbreaker (1973, Remastered 2002 with Bonus Tracks) album to be listened as stream on Spotify

Free (band) albums
1973 albums
Albums produced by Andy Johns
Island Records albums